Homeodomain-only protein is a protein that in humans is encoded by the HOPX gene. It is an important regulator of cardiac development and a marker of hippocampal neural stem cells.

Function 
The protein encoded by this gene is a homeodomain protein that lacks certain conserved residues required for DNA binding. It was reported that choriocarcinoma cell lines and tissues failed to express this gene, which suggested the possible involvement of this gene in malignant conversion of placental trophoblasts. Studies in mice suggested that this protein may interact with serum response factor (SRF) and modulate SRF-dependent cardiac-specific gene expression and cardiac development. Multiple alternatively spliced transcript variants encoding the same protein have been observed, the full-length natures of only some have been determined.

References

Further reading

External links 
 

Transcription factors